Seán Power (born 14 October 1960) is a former Irish Fianna Fáil politician. He was a Teachta Dála (TD) for the Kildare South constituency.

Power was born in Caragh, near Naas in County Kildare and was educated locally at the Christian Brothers School in Naas. His father Paddy Power was a TD, MEP and cabinet minister. His brother, J. J. Power is a former Green Party member of Kildare County Council.

He was first elected to Dáil Éireann at the 1989 general election, as a Fianna Fáil TD for the Kildare constituency, retaining his father's seat. He was re-elected at 1992, 1997, 2002 and 2007 general elections. He was a member of Kildare County Council from 1999 to 2004

In 1991, Power was a key member of the so-called "gang of four" which proposed a motion of no confidence in the Taoiseach, and the leader of his party, Charles Haughey. The other members of the group were Noel Dempsey, Liam Fitzgerald and M. J. Nolan. That incident led to Albert Reynolds's first bid for the leadership and to Haughey's eventual resignation in 1992. When Reynolds eventually became Taoiseach, Power was appointed Assistant Chief Whip. He served as a member of the Joint Committees on European Affairs and on the Environment and Local Government.

In Bertie Ahern's 2004 reshuffle, Power was appointed as Minister of State at the Department of Health and Children with special responsibility for Health Promotion. After the 2007 general election he was appointed as Minister of State at the Department of Justice, Equality and Law Reform with special responsibility for Equality. 

On 13 May 2008, shortly after Brian Cowen became Taoiseach, he was appointed as Minister of State at the Department of Communications, Energy and Natural Resources with special responsibility for Information Society and Natural Resources. He served in this position until April 2009 when he was dropped in a reshuffle where the number of junior ministers was reduced from 20 to 15.

He lost his seat at the 2011 general election. He was elected to Kildare County Council for the Kildare–Newbridge area in May 2014. He did not contest the 2019 local elections.

See also
Families in the Oireachtas

References

1960 births
Living people
Fianna Fáil TDs
Local councillors in County Kildare
Members of the 26th Dáil
Members of the 27th Dáil
Members of the 28th Dáil
Members of the 29th Dáil
Members of the 30th Dáil
Ministers of State of the 29th Dáil
Ministers of State of the 30th Dáil
Politicians from County Kildare
People from Naas